The 2016 Northwestern State Demons football team represented Northwestern State University as a member of the Southland Conference during the 2016 NCAA Division I FCS football season. Led by fourth-year head coach Jay Thomas, the Demons compiled an overall record of 1–10 with a mark of 0–9 in conference play, placing last out of 11 teams in the Southland. Northwestern State played home games at Harry Turpin Stadium in Natchitoches, Louisiana.

Previous season
The Demons finished the season 4–7, 4–5 in Southland play to finish in a three-way tie for fifth place.

Schedule

Game summaries

@ Baylor

Sources:

Incarnate Word

Sources: Box Score

@ Central Arkansas

Sources:

@ Southeastern Louisiana

Sources:

Kentucky Wesleyan

Sources:

@ Lamar

Sources:

McNeese State

Sources:

Nicholls

Sources:

@ Abilene Christian

Sources:

Sam Houston State

Sources:

@ Stephen F. Austin

Sources:

References

Northwestern State
Northwestern State Demons football seasons
Northwestern State Demons football